The Prisoner is a 1923 American silent drama film set in a fictional kingdom, directed by Jack Conway and featuring Herbert Rawlinson, Eileen Percy, June Elvidge, George Cowl and Boris Karloff. Karloff was paid $150.00 a week salary for working on this film. The screenplay was written by Edward T. Lowe Jr., based on a novel called Castle Craneycrow by George Barr McCutcheon. The film is considered to be lost.

Cast
 Herbert Rawlinson as Philip Quentin
 Eileen Percy as Dorothy Garrison
 George Cowl as Lord Bob
 June Elvidge as Lady Francis
 Lincoln Stedman as Dickey Savage
 Gertrude Short as Lady Jane
 Bertram Grassby as Prince Ugo Ravorelli
 Mario Carillo as Count Sallonica
 Hayford Hobbs as Duke Laselli
 Lillian Langdon as Mrs. Garrison
 Bert Sprotte as Courant
 Boris Karloff as Prince Kapolski
 Esther Ralston as Marie
 J. P. Lockney as Father Bivot

See also
 Boris Karloff filmography

References

External links

1923 films
1923 drama films
1923 lost films
Silent American drama films
American silent feature films
American black-and-white films
Films directed by Jack Conway
Lost American films
Universal Pictures films
Lost drama films
1920s American films